Indigofera glaucescens is a species of flowering plant in the family Fabaceae, native to the Cape Provinces of South Africa. It is consumed by common warthogs (Phacochoerus africanus).

References

glaucescens
Endemic flora of South Africa
Flora of the Cape Provinces
Plants described in 1836